These are the official results of the Women's Triple Jump event at the 1997 IAAF World Championships in Athens, Greece. There were a total number of 41 participating athletes, with two qualifying groups and the final held on Monday August 4, 1997. The qualification mark was set at 14.30 metres.

Medalists

Results

Qualification
Held on Saturday 1997-08-02

Qualification: 14.30 m (Q) or at least 12 best (q) qualified for the final.

Final

See also
 1996 Women's Olympic Triple Jump

References
 Results

T
Triple jump at the World Athletics Championships
1997 in women's athletics